Dwight Thomas O.D (born 23 September 1980) is a Jamaican sprinter, mainly competing in the 100 metres event and more recently the 110 m hurdles.

Career

He won the bronze medal at the IAAF World Junior Championships in 1998 at the 100 m and gold medal in the 4 × 100 m relay, competed in the 2000 and 2004 Summer Olympics and finished 5th at the 2005 World Championships. Later in 2005 he placed third at the IAAF World Athletics Final; he was ranked #4 in the world that year by Track & Field News.

Thomas represented Jamaica at the 2008 Summer Olympics in Beijing. He competed at the 4 × 100 m relay together with Michael Frater, Nesta Carter and Asafa Powell. In their qualification heat they placed first in front of Canada, Germany and China. Their time of 38.31 was the second out of sixteen participating nations in the first round and they qualified for the final. Thomas was replaced by Usain Bolt for the final race and they sprinted to a new world record time of 37.10 seconds, claiming the gold medal. The gold medal was later vacated by the IOC in 2017 when a retest of teammate Nesta Carter found the presence of the prohibited substance methylhexaneamine.

Thomas started athletics at an early age, competing for Calabar High School. He won gold medals at the CARIFTA Games in both 1998 and 1999.

At the 1998 World Junior Championships in Annecy, France, Thomas competed for Jamaica winning a bronze medal in the 100 m, the first in his country's history in the event at the time. Three days later Jamaica won the 4 × 100 m relay.

In 1999 Thomas competed at the Junior Pan American Games in Tampa, Florida, winning the 100 m in 10.37 and the 200 m in 20.66; he was also a part of the winning 4 × 400 m relay team, running the second leg in the finals.

While Thomas attended Clemson University he was the ACC Athlete of the year winning the 60 m and the 60 m hurdles indoor, 100 m and the 200 m outdoor at the ACC Championship and an All American at the NCAA indoor Championship 2002. Thomas was the runner up at the NCAA Championship in the 100 m and the 200 m outdoor, held at LSU in Baton Rouge, to Justin Gatlin, who two years later would become the Olympic Champion in the 100 m.

Thomas transferred to the University of Florida in the fall of 2002 to continue his studies and coached by Mike Holloway, the Head Track & Field coach of the Gators. Thomas opted to go pro instead after finding out, he had to sit out his first year after arriving at Florida under a partial release from Clemson University. He would continue his studies at Florida, while being coached and mentored by Coach Holloway.

Personal bests

100 metres - 10.00 (2005)
200 metres - 20.29 (2007)
110 metres hurdles - 13.15 (2011)

Achievements

References

External links
 
 
 

1980 births
Living people
Jamaican male sprinters
Athletes (track and field) at the 1999 Pan American Games
Athletes (track and field) at the 2002 Commonwealth Games
Athletes (track and field) at the 2000 Summer Olympics
Athletes (track and field) at the 2004 Summer Olympics
Athletes (track and field) at the 2008 Summer Olympics
Olympic athletes of Jamaica
Clemson Tigers men's track and field athletes
Commonwealth Games medallists in athletics
Pan American Games bronze medalists for Jamaica
Commonwealth Games silver medallists for Jamaica
Pan American Games medalists in athletics (track and field)
Competitors stripped of Summer Olympics medals
Athletes (track and field) at the 2015 Pan American Games
World Athletics Championships winners
Medalists at the 1999 Pan American Games
Medallists at the 2002 Commonwealth Games